SM U-39 was a German Type U 31 U-boat which operated in the Mediterranean Sea during World War I. It ended up being the second most successful U-boat participating in the war, sinking 149 merchant ships for a total of 404,774 GRT.

Its longest-serving captain was Kptlt. Walther Forstmann, who was awarded the Pour le Mérite during command on U-39.

From January to mid-1917, Martin Niemöller served as U-39s coxswain. He is known as the author of the poem "First they came" which is inscribed at the New England Holocaust Museum. As an enemy of the Third Reich, he was imprisoned from 1938 to 1945 in Sachsenhausen and Dachau. In 1917 and 1918, Karl Dönitz served as watch officer on this boat. He later became Grand Admiral and Commander in Chief of the German Navy, and, for three weeks, the 4th President of Germany.

Design
German Type U 31 submarines were double-hulled ocean-going submarines similar to Type 23 and Type 27 subs in dimensions and differed only slightly in propulsion and speed. They were considered very good high sea boats with average manoeuvrability and good surface steering.

The U-boat was armed with four  torpedo tubes, two fitted in the bow and two in the stern, and carried 6 torpedoes.
The boat's complement was 4 officers and 31 enlisted.

Fate
On 27 April 1918, U-39 sailed from Pola under command of Kapitänleutnant Heinrich Metzger, for operations in the Western Mediterranean.

At 13:50 on 18 May, when in a position , U-39 was attacked by two French seaplanes. It crash-dived, but when reaching a depth of 12 meters two bombs exploded very close; the after torpedo room flooded, the diving planes were destroyed, and the boat began sinking by the stern. Kptlt. Metzger ordered the tanks blown and U-39 surfaced, but the heavy damage suffered prevented diving again. Metzger was forced to lay a course for the nearest Spanish harbour, Cartagena.

At about 17:00, U-39 was attacked again by two seaplanes; it fought back with gun and machine-guns, and the enemy bombs caused no damage, but during the action two crewmen (sailor Schulz and stoker Hausottl) fell overboard and were lost.

In the evening U-39 reached Cartagena and was interned for the remainder of the war.

It was surrendered to France on 22 March 1919 and was broken up at Toulon in 1923.

Summary of raiding history

References

Notes

Citations

Bibliography

External links

German Type U 31 submarines
U-boats commissioned in 1915
World War I submarines of Germany
1914 ships
Ships built in Kiel